Houses of the Oireachtas Channel or publicly called Oireachtas TV is a public service broadcaster for the two houses of the Oireachtas (Irish parliament).

The channel was created under the Broadcasting Act 2009 for broadcast on the proposed roll out of Irish Digital Terrestrial Television. The channel broadcasts in the Irish and English languages.

History
Oireachtas TV has been available online for a number of years and both public service broadcasters RTÉ and TG4 have carried coverage of each of the Houses of the Oireachtas. RTÉ provides a late night round up with the Oireachtas Report and at noon Leaders Questions. TG4 broadcast live Dáil proceedings with their service Dáil Beo and also provide extensive live coverage of Committee meetings.

In November 2007 the then Taoiseach Bertie Ahern announced in the Dáil that he favoured an Oireachtas channel stating that "compared with a lot of tripe that is on TV, the Oireachtas channel would be far better and very interesting." Since the statement the government have moved to make Oireachtas TV a reality on the digital terrestrial platform (Saorview) in Ireland, and have included it in the Broadcasting Act 2009. Chapter 6 of the Broadcasting Act 2009 clearly sets out the role of the Houses of the Oireachtais Channel. However the Oireachtas Commission have yet to decide when the launch will occur.

On 15 November 2011, Oireachtas TV began broadcasting on UPC Ireland channel 801, initially as part of a trial initiative for a period of six months. The trial service was delivered at no additional cost to the Houses of the Oireachtas or the tax-payer. On 18 September 2012, Oireachtas TV moved to channel 207 following a positive public reaction to the service. It launched on Sky on 17 September 2014.

Cost
The channel will cost €200,000 annually to broadcast and is financed through the tax payer. The channel has put aside €250,000 to provide the service on all major television service providers.

Availability
The channel was first launched on a trial basis on Saorview. The pilot channel later launched on UPC Ireland on November 15, 2011. By September 2014 UPC confirmed a 20% growth in viewership of the channel on their service. The channel later became available on Sky Ireland on September 17, 2014. The channel formally launched on September 22, 2014 and is now available on UPC Ireland, and Sky Ireland. Eircom's eVision started broadcasting the channel on 14 November 2014.  The channel has a potential market of 1.1 million viewers.
On January 12, 2016 it became available on Saorview.

See also
BBC Parliament
C-SPAN

References

External links

Broadcasting Act 2009

Television stations in Ireland
Television channels and stations established in 2011
2011 establishments in Ireland
Oireachtas
Legislature broadcasters